Betoño is a village in Álava, Basque Country, Spain.

The village, to the east of Vitoria-Gasteiz city centre, gives its name to a nearby industrial estate which contains a large Michelin tyre factory, and to Betoño Sports Complex, used for training and matches by many of the football clubs in the area, including the local professional club Deportivo Alavés. The Salburua wetlands and the Fernando Buesa Arena (Saski Baskonia basketball team) lie to the east of Betoño.

References

Populated places in Álava
Vitoria-Gasteiz